Sepahan Ladies Football Club is an Iranian women's football club based in Isfahan, Isfahan province who play in Kowsar Women Football League.

The team was known as Ayandehsazan Mihan until 2017 when they ran into financial problems and were taken over by the popular men's football team Sepahan.

History
In the 2016–17 season, Ayandehsazan finished first in the Kowsar Women Football League to claim their first league championship.

Sepahan
Before the 2017–18 season, Sepahan took over the club and renamed to Sepahan.

Sources

Football clubs in Iran
Women's football clubs in Iran